Nikos Barboudis (born 6 March 1989) is a Romanian-born Greek football player who plays as a right back for Ayia Napa. His uncle, Mihai Neşu, was also a football player, who represented Romania at international level. His grandfather, Mircea Neşu was a footballer, referee, and doctor.

References

External links

1989 births
Living people
Sportspeople from Cluj-Napoca
Greek footballers
Romanian footballers
Association football defenders
Ilisiakos F.C. players
AEK Athens F.C. players
Apollon Pontou FC players
Panthrakikos F.C. players
Ayia Napa FC players
Ethnikos Achna FC players
Anagennisi Deryneia FC players
Cypriot First Division players
Greek expatriate footballers
Expatriate footballers in Cyprus
Romanian expatriates in Cyprus
Romanian people of Greek descent